The Manchester Street Generating Station is a 510 MW gas-fired power station in the Jewelry District of Providence, Rhode Island. The plant has three Siemens gas turbines and three ABB steam turbines.

The power station is owned by Starwood Energy Group, which purchased the facility from Dominion Energy in 2018.

History 
The Manchester Street Generating Station was constructed as a coal-burning power plant in 1903 by the Rhode Island Company, in part to power trolley lines. The monumental Georgian revival building is thought to be designed by architect Alfred Stone. In 1913, the company constructed two additions to the original power house: a boiler room and a switch house. The facility was purchased from the Rhode Island Company by the Narragansett Electric Company in 1926.

In 1940, noted architect Paul Philippe Cret designed an addition to the building's southern facade, as part of renovations to convert the station to fuel oil. A 1996 renovation by William D. Warner Architects & Planners integrated postmodern elements and the structure's three smokestacks.

See also 
 South Street Station

References 

Energy infrastructure completed in 1903
Buildings and structures in Providence, Rhode Island
Power stations in Rhode Island